{{speciesbox
| name = Blue-rumped parrot
| image = Blue-rumped Parrot Psittinus cyanurus (6970039210).jpg
| status = NT
| status_system = IUCN3.1
| status_ref = 
| genus = Psittinus
| species = cyanurus
| authority = (Forster, JR, 1795)}}

The blue-rumped parrot (Psittinus cyanurus) is a parrot found in the very southern tip of Myanmar, peninsular Thailand, Malaysia, Borneo, Sumatra and nearby islands. It is a small parrot (18 cm) and is primarily green with bright red underwing coverts, a reddish shoulder patch, and yellowish margins on the wing coverts. It is sexually dimorphic. The female has a grey-brown head. The male has a black mantle, red upper mandible, and blue head and rump.

It was formerly considered the only member of the genus Psittinus, but BirdLife International recognised the subspecies abbottii as a separate species, the Simeulue parrot, and the IOC later followed suit, supporting it as a distinct species. Birdlife datazone species factsheet Simeulue parrot

There are two subspecies:
 P. c. cyanurus: Burma, Thailand, Malaysia, Singapore, Borneo, Sumatra.
 P. c. pontius: Mentawi Islands southwards from Siberut. Larger than the nominate subspecies.

It is found in lowland forests, generally below 700 m, in forest, open woodland, orchards and plantations, mangroves, dense scrub, and coconut groves. It occurs in flocks up to 20 birds. They eat seeds, fruit and blossoms.

References

Juniper & Parr (1998) Parrots: A Guide to Parrots of the World''; .

External links
 Oriental Bird Images: Blue-rumped Parrot  Selected photos

blue-rumped parrot
Birds of Malesia
Near threatened animals
Near threatened biota of Asia
blue-rumped parrot